The 2006 WTA Tour Championships, also known as the Sony Ericsson Championships, was a women's round robin tennis tournament played on indoor hard courts at the Madrid Arena in Madrid, Spain. It was the 36th edition of the year-end singles championships, the 31st edition of the year-end doubles championships, and was part of the 2006 WTA Tour. The tournament was held between 7 November and 12 November 2006. Fourth-seeded Justine Henin-Hardenne won the singles event and earned $1,000,000 first-prize money as well as 525 ranking points. With her victory Henin-Hardenne secured her year-end No.1 ranking.

Finals

Singles

 Justine Henin-Hardenne defeated  Amélie Mauresmo, 6–4, 6–3.

Doubles

 Lisa Raymond /  Samantha Stosur defeated  Cara Black /  Rennae Stubbs, 3–6, 6–3, 6–3.

References

External links
 
 Championships draws (PDF)

 
WTA
WTA Tour Championships
WTA Tour Championships
WTA
2006 in Madrid